The Andaman Islands grass skink (Eutropis andamanensis) is a species of skink found in the Andaman Islands of India.

References
 Greer, A.E., Arnold, C. & Arnold, E.N. 2000 The systematic significance of the number of presacral vertebrae in the scincid lizard genus Mabuya. Amphibia-Reptilia 21: 121-126

Eutropis
Reptiles described in 1935
Taxa named by Malcolm Arthur Smith